The 1966–67 Illinois Fighting Illini men's basketball team represented the University of Illinois.

Regular season
A dark cloud loomed over the Fighting Illini's men's basketball team as the 1966-67 season commenced.  An investigation revolving around a "slush-fund" program which provided funds to athletes within the basketball and football programs had come to the conclusion that many integral parts of the administration, coaching staff, as well as athletes, were culpable and should be punished.  The basketball team was the first to feel the brunt of sanctions caused by the "slush fund". For the first few weeks of the season, the 1966-67 Illini team was proving to be one of the elite teams in college basketball.  They had defeated Kentucky 98-97 at Kentucky in early December, a feat the Illini had done only one other time in their history.  Prior to the revelations, the team's only loss was by 2 points at the hands of West Virginia on their home court in Morgantown.  Then, just two days before Christmas, while the team awaited its Chicago Stadium game with California, three fifths of the starting lineup were declared ineligible.

Rich Jones, Ron Dunlap and Steve Kuberski never again played for Illinois, and Harry Combes and his assistant Howie Braun was forced to resign at the end of the season. The team that remained bonded together and defeated Cal, 97-87. Remaining starter Jim Dawson took over the scoring load from that point on, but the real surprise that night, and for the remainder of the season, was Dave Scholz.

Scholz, a 6-foot-7 sophomore from Decatur, had seen only limited action in the first five games of the season. From the Cal game and beyond, Scholz utilized his opportunity to play by becoming the second leading scorer on this team and the leading scorer the following two seasons.  Not only did he become the leading scorer, he was also named a Helms Foundation first-team All-American each of his remaining years. The dismissal of the three starters also gave impetus to a Big 10 MVP award for Dawson.

Eventually, reality set in, and the Illini finished with a 12-12 record and a seventh-place finish in the Big 10. Based on the negative findings, Illinois was forced to hire a new athletic director and new head basketball coach. Gene Vance was hired to be athletic director and was asked to guide the Illini back to respectability.

The university began the investigation into the "slush-fund" as a good faith gesture to demonstrate to the Big Ten commissioners that they were willing to handle any negative consequences in-house.  University President David D. Henry found that 12 active football and basketball players had received illegal aid, seven football, 5 basketball.  It also found that 17 other athletes had received aid since 1962, totaling approximately $21,500.  The salt in the wound came from Big Ten commissioner Bill Reed, who emphasized that, even though the university had completed its investigation and dismissed the parties involved, the conference would continue the investigation further and hand down a formal decision on March 4, 1967. The decision, after a fairly brief debate, made by the conference athletic directors, including ex-offenders Biggie Munn and Forest Evashevski, called for Illinois to fire Elliott, Combes and Braun or "show cause" why the university should not be suspended or dropped from Big Ten membership.  Based on the fact that the committee making the decision was made up of several members who had been guilty of infractions themselves, President Henry became outraged.  The university appealed the decision while "friends of the coaches" began circulating petitions with hopes of pressuring the school into keeping them regardless of the consequences.  On March 18, the Big Ten issued its ultimatum to the University of Illinois. In a statement from the commissioner, it was demanded that the implicated coaches be fired or the school could face an indefinite suspension. When the dust settled, football coach Pete Elliott and basketball coaches Combes and Braun all had their existing contracts terminated on August 31, 1967.

Combes finished his 20-year career with 316 wins, three conference titles (1949, 1951, and 1952) and his 1963 team sharing a portion of the Big Ten Championship with Ohio State.  Along with the conference championships, Combes' teams finished the NCAA Tournament in third place three times and in the Elite Eight once during his tenure.

The 1966-67 team's starting lineup included Deon Flessner and Benny Louis at the forward spots, Dawson and Preston Pearson as guards and Scholz at center.

Roster

Source

Schedule
												
Source																
												

|-		
!colspan=12 style="background:#DF4E38; color:white;"| Non-Conference regular season										

|-
!colspan=9 style="background:#DF4E38; color:#FFFFFF;"|Big Ten regular season

|-

Player stats

*Jones, Dunlap and Kuberski were deemed ineligible on December 23rd due to the "Slush-Fund" scandal.

Awards and honors
Jim Dawson
Team Most Valuable Player 
Big Ten Player of the Year
Honorable Mention All-American (Converse)
Dave Scholz
Honorable Mention All-American (Converse)

Team players drafted into the NBA

Rankings

References

Illinois Fighting Illini
Illinois Fighting Illini men's basketball seasons
1966 in sports in Illinois
1967 in sports in Illinois